Daniel Lowenstein may refer to:
Daniel H. Lowenstein (attorney) (born 1943), professor of law at UCLA Law School
Daniel H. Lowenstein (physician), professor in the Department of Neurology at the University of California, San Francisco